Deborah Fraser may refer to:
Deborah Fraser (singer) (1965–2022), South African vocalist
Deborah Fraser (academic), New Zealand academic